Luis Alberto Nuñez Charales (born 10 December 1983 in Santa Marta) is a Colombian former footballer who played as a left back.

His form in the domestic league has led him to his first call up to the Colombia national football team for the FIFA World Cup qualifier match against Venezuela

On 15 March 2011, he scored a goal in the second half against the Mexican club San Luis in the Copa Libertadores.

International goals

References

External links 

1983 births
Living people
Colombian footballers
Association football defenders
Cerro Porteño players
Once Caldas footballers
Cúcuta Deportivo footballers
Independiente Medellín footballers
Boyacá Chicó F.C. footballers
Patriotas Boyacá footballers
Dorados de Sinaloa footballers
Atlético Bucaramanga footballers
Categoría Primera A players
Categoría Primera B players
Paraguayan Primera División players
Colombia international footballers
Colombian expatriate footballers
Colombian expatriate sportspeople in Paraguay
Colombian expatriate sportspeople in Mexico
Expatriate footballers in Paraguay
Expatriate footballers in Mexico
People from Santa Marta
Sportspeople from Magdalena Department